Carolina Azedo Won-Held de Freitas (born ) is a retired Brazilian female volleyball player, playing as an outside hitter. She was part of the Brazil women's national volleyball team.

She participated in the 2010 Women's Pan-American Volleyball Cup.

References

External links
  

1992 births
Living people
Brazilian women's volleyball players
Place of birth missing (living people)
Outside hitters